Pinus pringlei, commonly known as Pringle's pine, is a species of conifer in the family Pinaceae.
It is found only in Mexico. The specific epithet, pringlei, honours Cyrus Guernsey Pringle (1838–1911), an American botanist, explorer and plant breeder.

References

pringlei
Least concern plants
Taxonomy articles created by Polbot